Orange Hill may refer to:

 Orange Hill, Queensland, Australia
 Orange Hill, Saint James, Barbados, a community in Saint James, Barbados
 Orange Hill, New Brunswick, a community in Saint John County, New Brunswick, Canada
 Orange Hill, Saint Vincent, a community in Charlotte Parish, Saint Vincent and the Grenadines
 Orange Hill, Tobago, a town in Trinidad and Tobago
 Orange Hills, California, United States